Mark Nowak is an American poet, as well as cultural critic, playwright and essayist, from Buffalo, New York. 
Nowak is a professor in the English Department at Manhattanville College in Purchase, NY.

Awards
 2010 Guggenheim Fellowship
 2015 Freedom Plow Award

Works
Revenants, Coffee House Press, 2000,

References

External links

BBC World News America
"Against the Grain," KPFA

Living people
Year of birth missing (living people)
American male poets
English-language poets
Writers from Buffalo, New York
St. Catherine University faculty
Manhattanville College faculty